"Candy" is a song by American rapper and singer Doja Cat for her debut album, Amala (2018). Released on March 23, 2018, as the second single from the album, through Kemosabe and RCA. The song was written by Doja Cat alongside producers Budo & Yeti Beats and additional producer Cambo. "Candy" peaked at number 86 on the Billboard Hot 100 chart.

Background and composition
"Candy" was written by Amala Dlamini and Cameron Bartolini. Bartolini also co-produced the single with Budo and Yeti Beats and worked with the instruments. The song was mixed by Neal Pogue. "Candy" was released on March 23, 2018, as the second single from Doja Cat's debut studio album Amala (2018). Following its release, she posted a preview on her Instagram account. The audio video for the song premiered simultaneously as the single. According to the sheet music published at Musicnotes.com by Sony/ATV Music Publishing, the song is performed in the key of G Minor with an up-tempo 120 beats per minute.

Critical reception
"Candy" received generally positive reviews from music critics. Mike Wass of Idolator praised it as a "trap-heavy hip-hop jam", and AllMusic's Matt Collar selected it as one of the album's highlights. Milca P. of HotNewHipHop praised the song's musical direction and said it "leans more toward the typically R&B-heavy catalog of the RCA signee". Rap-Up added to their blog "Rising rapper-singer Doja Cat continues to ‘push the envelope’ on her latest, risqué and sensually-driven single, Candy."

Andrew P. Hale for PopMatters described the song as "smooth but adult-oriented" and pointed it out for its sexual themes, writing that "A very smooth and intimate beat with a degree of excitement by Budo, Cambo, and Yeti Beats, Doja Cat rides it with confidence and talent. Better for husbands and wives, can't promote the content for the youth."

Credits and personnel
Recording and management
 Engineered at The Himalayas (Los Angeles, California)
 Mastered at Bernie Grundman Mastering (Hollywood, California)
 Mau Publishing, Inc./Prescription Songs (BMI), Yeti Yeti Yeti Music/WB Music Corp. (ASCAP), GutterFunk/WB Music Corp. (ASCAP), Cameron Bartolini Music (ASCAP)

Personnel

Doja Cat – vocals, songwriting
David Sprecher – songwriting; production, engineering 
Joshua Karp – songwriting; production 
Cameron Bartolini – songwriting; additional production, engineering 
Neal H Pogue – mixing
Mike Bozzi – mastering

Credits adapted from Hot Pink (Japan Version) liner notes.

Charts

Weekly charts

Year-end charts

Certifications

Release history

References

2018 songs
2018 singles
Doja Cat songs
RCA Records singles
Songs written by Doja Cat
Songs written by Yeti Beats
Song recordings produced by Yeti Beats
Kemosabe Records singles
Trap music songs